In law, a prohibited degree of kinship refers to a degree of consanguinity (blood relatedness) and sometimes affinity (relation by marriage or sexual relationship) between persons that results in certain actions between them being illegal. Two major examples of prohibited degrees are found in incest and nepotism. Incest refers to sexual relations and marriage between closely related individuals; nepotism is the preference of blood-relations in the distribution of a rank or office.

An incest taboo against sexual relations between parent and child or two full-blooded siblings is a cultural universal. Taboos against sexual relations between individuals of other close degrees of relationship vary, but stigmatization of unions with full siblings and with direct descendants are widespread.

Marital prohibitions

China (Mainland)

Civil Code of the People’s Republic of China Article 1048 stipulated that persons who are lineal relatives by blood, or collateral relatives by blood up to the third degree of kinship are prohibited from being married.

According to the official explanation, the calculation of degree of consanguinity in China is similar to Roman civil law with some difference. Aforementioned "collateral relatives by blood up to the third degree of kinship" include:

 full and half siblings
 uncles and niece; aunt and nephew
 first cousins (which is counted as fourth degree of kinship in Roman civil law tradition)

In Imperial China (221 BCE to 1912), marriage between first cousins was partially allowed. Marrying the child of one’s paternal aunt, maternal uncle or aunt was generally accepted in Chinese history during most of China’s dynastic era. However, among other exceptions, marrying the child of your paternal uncle was strictly prohibited, as such a marriage was seen as one between siblings as each of the couple bore the same family name.

Medieval canon law

Roman civil law prohibited marriages within four degrees of consanguinity. This was calculated by counting up from one prospective partner to the common ancestor, then down to the other prospective partner. The first prohibited degree of consanguinity was a parent-child relationship while a second degree would be a sibling relationship. A third degree would be an uncle/aunt with a niece/nephew while fourth degree was between first cousins. Any prospective marriage partner with a blood relationship outside these prohibited degrees was considered acceptable. 

The Roman Catholic Church and Eastern Orthodox Church have a long history of marital prohibitions, called impediments to marriage, which limit the marriage of two closely related relatives. Initially, canon law followed Roman civil law until the early 9th century, when the Western Church increased the number of prohibited degrees from four to seven. The method of calculation was also changed to simply count the number of generations back to the common ancestor. This meant that marriage to anyone up to and including a sixth cousin was prohibited. The Fourth Lateran Council of 1215 decreed a change from seven prohibited degrees back to four (but retaining the same method of calculating; counting back to the common ancestor).

Australia
In Australia, the Marriage Act 1961 prohibits a marriage to a direct ancestor or descendant or sibling (whether full sibling or half sibling), including those arising from a legal adoption. Such marriages are void.

England and Wales, and the World-wide Anglican Communion

The 1662 Book of Common Prayer of the Church of England, long used in various forms through a broad swathe of Anglicanism, included a Table of Kindred and Affinity listing the prohibited degrees of kinship within which one could not marry describing in detail the cases in which marriage was forbidden due to consanguinity or marital affinity. The list was enacted by the Marriage Act 1949 which with significant changes continues to apply in England and Wales. The list was cut back by the Marriage (Prohibited Degrees of Relationship) Act 1986, by deleting from the list prohibitions based on affinity relationships, and added to in other respects. Marriages that continue to be prohibited in England and Wales by the 1949 Act are as follows:

The Children Act 1975 added the following prohibitions:

The Marriage Act 1949 also prohibited marriage to the following affinity relations, but these were repealed by the Marriage (Prohibited Degrees of Relationship) Act 1986:

The Marriage (Prohibited Degrees of Relationship) Act 1986 prohibits a marriage to the following, until both parties are aged 21 or over, and provided that the younger party has not at any time before attaining the age of 18 been a child of the family in relation to the other party:

The Marriage (Prohibited Degrees of Relationship) Act 1986 also prohibits a marriage to the following:

The Marriage Act 1949 (Remedial) Order 2007 accepted the ruling of the European Court of Human Rights and removed the ban on marriage with a former mother-in-law/daughter-in-law.

South Africa
In South Africa, sexual relations are prohibited within the first degree of affinity, that is, where one person is the direct ancestor or descendant of the spouse of the other person.

South Korea
In South Korea it had historically been forbidden to marry someone with the same surname and clan regardless of the distance of the relation, but this law was ruled unconstitutional in 1999. Conservative Lutherans also prohibit marriage within close degrees of consanguinity and affinity, even if not specifically outlawed by the state.

Taiwan

Article 983 of the Civil Code stipulates that a person may not marry any of the following relatives:

(1) A lineal relative by blood or by marriage;

(2) A collateral relative by blood is within the sixth degree of relationship. The limit to marriage shall not be applicable to persons of lineal relative within the fourth degree of relationship and collateral relative within the sixth degree of relationship by adoption.

(3) A collateral relative by marriage is within the fifth degree of relationship of a different rank.
The marriage prohibitions between relatives by marriage provided in the preceding paragraph shall continue to apply even after the dissolution of the marriage which has created the relationship.
The limit to marriage with the lineal relative by blood or by marriage set forth in the first paragraph hereof shall be applicable to persons of lineal relative by adoption after ending of the adoption relationship. 

The Judicial Yuan Interpretation No.32 and No. 91 allows marriage between siblings by adoption when the adoption was intended for the marriage. When the interpretation was made, it was not uncommon for parents to adopt a child so that their own child can marry the adopted child when both children have grown up.

Article 968 and 970 of the Civil Code states that"the degree of relationship by blood between a person and his lineal relative by blood shall be determined by counting the number of generations upwards or downwards from himself [as the case may be], one generation being taken as one degree. As between the person and his collateral relative, the degree of relationship shall be determined by the total number of generations counting upwards from himself to the common lineal ancestor and then from such common ancestor downwards to the relative by blood with whom the degree of relationship is to be determined." The line and degree of relationship between relatives by marriage shall be determined as follows: 

(1) In regard to the spouse of a relative by blood, by the line and degree of relationship of the person who is married to the said spouse; 

(2) In regard to a relative by blood of a spouse, by the line and the degree of relationship between such relative by blood and the said spouse; 

(3) In regard to the person who is married to the relative by blood of his spouse, by the line and the degree of relationship between such person and the said spouse.

In short, a person can be considered as being "merged" with their spouse when counting degree of relationship.

United States

, 30 U.S. states prohibit most or all marriage between first cousins, and a bill is pending in Maryland that would prohibit most first cousins from marrying. Six states prohibit marriages between first cousins once removed. Some states that prohibit cousin marriage recognize cousin marriages performed in other states.

Jury service

United States
Statutes in the U.S. state of Georgia disqualify a juror if that person is related "by consanguinity or affinity" to any party "within the sixth degree as computed according to the civil law".

Virginia rulings in Jaques v. Commonwealth, 51 Va. (10 Gratt.) 690 (1853), stated the long-standing, common-law rule disqualifying a venireman (juror) who is related, within the ninth degree of consanguinity or affinity, to a party to a suit.

See also
 Affinity (law)
 Cousin marriage
 Inbreeding
 Mahram

References

External links
 "Consanguinity" – Catholic Encyclopaedia
 Don't hire the family – Article regarding Texas nepotism statutes, published by the Texas Association of Counties.

Incest
Kinship and descent
Family law legal terminology
Endogamy